We Are King is the debut album by R&B trio King (currently named We Are King), released on February 5, 2016. The album was nominated for Best Urban Contemporary Album at the 59th Grammy Awards, making them the first independent artists to be nominated in that category. Upon its release, We Are King appeared 6 times in the Billboard charts for 1st week sales: #1 on the Heatseekers Chart, #7 for Independent Albums, #8 for R&B, #20 for Top Hip-Hop/R&B, #78 for Top Album Sales, and #158 in the Top 200.

Background
We Are King is the debut full-length album from King, following their 2011 release of The Story EP. The independently recorded and produced album contains 12 tracks, including extended mixes of the three songs from The Story EP; "The Story", "Supernatural", and "Hey". We Are King was recorded between 2011 and 2015 at King Creative, the Strother sisters' home studio in Los Angeles, California. The album was written by the three members, and features production and instrumentation by Paris Strother, with additional instrumentation by Kyle Bolden (guitar), Thomas Lea (strings), and The Regiment Horns (brass & woodwinds). The album was engineered and recorded by Paris Strother, with additional engineering by Morris Hayes (lead vocals on "Supernatural") and Nathaniel Alford (lead vocals on "Hey"). We Are King was mixed by Neal Pogue and mastered by Brian "Big Bass" Gardner at Bernie Grundman Mastering. The album cover design was a collaboration between visual artist Geoff Kim and Paris Strother, with photography by Alex King.

Critical reception

We Are King and the single "The Greatest" were included on numerous mid-year and year-end lists.

Accolades

Track listing
All songs written and composed by Paris Strother, Amber Strother and Anita Bias.

Personnel 
Credits adapted from the album's liner notes.

King
 Paris Strother – producer, composer, instrumentalist, engineer, background vocals (all tracks)
 Amber Strother – composer, vocals, background vocals (all tracks)
 Anita Bias – composer, vocals, background vocals (all tracks)

Additional personnel
 Kyle Bolden – guitar (tracks 1, 3, 7, 9 & 10)
 Thomas Lea – strings (tracks 3, 4, & 6)
 The Regiment Horns – brass & woodwinds (Tracks 4, 9, & 10)
 Morris Hayes – engineer (track 4)
 Nathaniel Alford – engineer (track 9)
 Neal Pogue – mix engineer (all tracks)
 Brian "Big Bass" Gardner – mastering engineer (all tracks)

Cover art personnel
 Alex King – photo
 Geoff Kim – cover design
 Paris Strother – cover design

References

2016 debut albums
Contemporary R&B albums by American artists